The mixed 4 × 400 metres relay at the 2021 World Athletics Relays was held at the Silesian Stadium on 1 and 2 May.

Records 
Prior to the competition, the records were as follows:

Results

Heats summary
Qualification: First 2 of each heat (Q) plus the 2 fastest times (q) advanced to the final.

 
 
 WL = World leading
 NR = National record
 SB = Seasonal best
 OG* = 2020 Olympic Games qualification
 WC* = 2022 World Championships qualification

Final 
Italian national track relay team confirms the first place obtained in the heats summary.

References

External links
World Athletics website

4 x 400 metres relay
4 × 400 metres relay
Relays